John Millman was the defending champion but chose not to defend his title.

Daniel Evans won the title after defeating Cameron Norrie 6–3, 6–4 in the final.

Seeds

Draw

Finals

Top half

Bottom half

References
 Main Draw
 Qualifying Draw

Nordic Naturals Challenger - Singles
2016 singles